The Caroní Municipality is one of the 11 municipalities (municipios) that makes up the Venezuelan state of Bolívar and, according to the 2011 census by the National Institute of Statistics of Venezuela, the municipality has a population of 704,585. The city of Guayana City is the shire town of the Caroní Municipality.

City Hall Foundation 

The historical background of this municipality dates back to the foundation in 1724 of the mission of Purísima Concepción de Nuestra Señora del Caroní. Later, in 1817, General Manuel Piar established a command and won the Battle of San Félix against the royalist General La Torre.

In 1819, the Congress of Angostura decreed the division of the missions' territory into four districts, in Bajo Caroní the municipalities of San Félix, Caruachi, Murucuri, Caroní and San Miguel were included; this in accordance with the ordinance of 1841 was transferred to the Puerto de Tablas.

In 1864, the Sovereign State of Guayana divided the territory into four departments: Ciudad Bolívar, Upata, Alto and Baixo Orinoco; San Félix is ​​not mentioned. At the end of the 19th century, the name of San Félix reappears and appears as a foreign municipality in the District of Piar. In the 1950s, the Companhia Mineira do Orinoco, at the confluence of the Orinoco and Caroní, established the infrastructure to explore the iron deposits of Cerro Bolívar.

In 1952 Puerto Ordaz is founded. In 1959, the Macagua I Dam came into operation. In 1960, the CVG was created. In 1961 Matanzas, Puerto Ordaz and San Félix were merged under the name Santo Tomé de Guayana (today Ciudad Guayana).

The creation of the District of Caroní took place on June 29, 1961, with the reform of the Law on Political Territorial Division of the state of Bolívar, with the capital of San Félix de Guayana and the populated centers of Puerto Ordaz, Matanzas, Castillito, Caruachi, La Ceiba and Alta Vista.

On December 29, 1960, Rómulo Betancourt, decreed by Organic Statute, the development of Guayana and created the Venezuelan Corporation of Guayana as the governing body. The Corporation chose July 2, 1961 to commemorate the anniversary of Ciudad Guayana, the date on which the first stone was laid.

In 1979 the District capital was changed (San Félix de Guayana by Santo Tomé de Guayana) and on June 25, 1986, the name was replaced by Ciudad Guayana, through the reform of the Territorial Political Division Law.

The Organic Law of the Municipal Regime of June 15, 1989 created the Municipality of Caroní, with its capital in San Félix, administered by various powers, with the City Hall being the local executive power and the City Council the local legislative power.

Demographics

The Caroní Municipality, according to a 2007 population estimate by the National Institute of Statistics of Venezuela, has a population of 777,283 (up from 678,179 in 2000). This amounts to 50.6% of the state's population.

Languages

Most of the population speaks Spanish as their mother tongue and also Most of the population speaks English.

Shield 
The Shield is surrounded by a blue border with eight stars; divided by two main districts: the one on the upper left contains a ship with unfurled sails, which represents one of those that traded with the Indies in the 18th century, in the lower part three pineapples from our continent that represent fruits discovered and converted into a symbol of tropical America , for the image of Europeans.

In the second quarter, the present and the future are represented. The red teardrop-shaped triangle signifies the struggle, the human effort to convert the mining wealth and use the country's energy and put it into production. The shield crowned in the wavy lines represents two rivers, the Orinoco and the Caroní, the round millstone, symbolizes the name of the Father of the Nation, the state and the first widely productive human machine. At the bottom is a yellow ribbon that identifies the most important dates in the life of Santo Tomé de Guayana.

Geomorphology 
In Ciudad Guayana there are three types of landscapes: Plain, Peniplanicie and Lomerio. The topography of flat landscapes is flat with slopes between 0-4%. The flat landscapes have a severely undulating topography with slopes of 4-16% and the Lomerio landscapes have undulating to heavily undulating topography and are made up of hills whose slopes are greater than 8%.

Geology 
Recent sedimentary deposits above the Imataca geological projection. It has alluvial deposits of gravel and sand, clayey deposits and loins of feldspathic and graonitic greisses.

Flora 
It is an area that offers a diversity of flora, this diversity can be explained by the great stability of the Massif Guayana throughout the geological ages, which was only affected by climatic changes, mainly during periods of severe drought.

Wildlife 
The importance of fauna lies in its value as a food source. It is an element of considerable importance, as it directly intervenes in the food cycle. The following were recorded: tapir, vaquiro, capybara, deer, cunaguaro, porcupine, macaw, hummingbird, cristofué, heron, zapoara, aimara, rattlesnake, verdegallo snake, terecay, among others.

Hydrography 
Most of the territory is formed by the Calinoso Massif of Ciudad Guayana, which is characterized by being a sector of low mountains with moderate or strongly undulating peneplains, whose heights vary between 40 and 350 meters above sea level, flanked by the Sierra Imataca to the North-East and Serra da Carambola to the South, where the most significant elevations are found, such as the Serra do Azul (556 m.a.s.l.) and Murciélago (455 m.a.s.l.). The municipality is bathed by the Orinoco and Caroní rivers. The Upata Rivers and their Yocoima and El Platanal tributaries drain into the former's basin, while the small La Ceiba River flows westward. The Ure and Retumbo rivers pay homage to the latter mainly.

Economy 

Ciudad Guayana is the headquarters of the basic companies that form the C.V.G. (Corporación Venezolana de Guayana) such as Alcasa, Venalum, Bauxilum, Carbonorca (primary aluminum products, alumina and carbon anodes for the aluminum industry, respectively), Ferrominera (extraction, processing and marketing of iron). It is also the headquarters of Alfredo Maneiro SIDOR (Siderúrgica del Orinoco) (a company nationalized by President Hugo Chávez in April 2008). Also based in this sector of the city are Venezuela's main electricity producer, Edelca, and the entity that promotes economic activity in the area, the Venezuelan Corporation of Guayana.

Education 

Ciudad Guayana is home to very important Universities, such as:
National Experimental Polytechnic University (UNEXPO)
 Andrés Bello Catholic University (UCAB)
 National Experimental University of Guayana (UNEG)
 National Experimental Polytechnic University of the Bolivarian Armed Forces (UNEFA)
 Great Mariscal University of Ayacucho (UGMA)

From University Institutes of Technology:
 La Salle Foundation for Natural Sciences (San Félix)
 I.U.T.I.R.L.A (Puerto Ordaz and San Félix)
 I.U.T. Antonio José de Sucre (Porto Ordaz)
 I.U.T. Pedro Emilio Coll (Puerto Ordaz)

From Polytechnic University Institutes:
 Santiago Mariño Polytechnic University Institute (IUPSM)

And Regional Centers of Study Houses such as:
 University of the East (UDO)
 Andrés Bello Catholic University (UCAB)
 Great Mariscal University of Ayacucho (UGMA)
 Bicentennial University of Aragua (UBA)

Sports 

Ciudad Guayana has a baseball stadium, Estadio La Ceiba with a capacity of 30,000 spectators, being the largest baseball stadium in Venezuela, although it does not have a professional team. It also has several professional football teams that participate in the different divisions of professional football, the most important being Mineros de Guayana, being the one with the most achievements at national and international level and one of the LALA F.C., which both teams play in the Venezuelan First Division, the Chicó de Guayana F.C. and the Fundación AIFI that both teams play in the Second Division of Venezuela all based in the majestic Cachamay Stadium in Ciudad Guayana with capacity for 41,600 spectators. In basketball playing in the LPB the team Gigantes de Guayana whose home is the Gimnasio Hermanas González with capacity for 2,000 spectators.

Tourism 

Within the city are the parks of La Llovizna and Cachamay, with their natural waterfalls. Other local attractions are the Ecomuseu del Caroní, the Macagua II Dam, probably the only case of a natural waterfall diversion dam within a city. The fracture of the relief of this natural waterfall features two natural waterfalls: the Cachamay waterfall close to the city itself, with an impressive width of about 800 m although low, and the La Llovizna waterfall, with several waterfalls of greater height and great flow, although a little shorter. In this last area, located on the right bank of the Caroní (near the old Mission Caroní, founded by the Catalan Capuchins), the Macagua I hydroelectric plant was built, diverting part of the river's flow and taking advantage of the natural unevenness of the relief. This dam was considerably expanded with a larger and higher reservoir, which gave rise to a larger hydroelectric plant, close to the existing one.

In the city, from the Angosturita bridge and in the port of San Félix, you can see the impressive union of the Orinoco and Caroní rivers; the different color of the waters of both rivers presents the natural spectacle of the struggle between two currents that first coexist, then intertwine and finally mix.

On December 3, 2006, the imposing Orinoquia bridge was inaugurated, which crosses the Orinoco River, avoiding the need to go to Ciudad Bolívar or use traditional barges.

Although Ciudad Guayana, because it is far from the sea, does not have marine beaches, it does have beaches on the banks of the Macagua reservoir on the banks of the Caroní River, among them is a camp called Playa Bonita, with tourist facilities.

Taking Puerto Ordaz as a starting point, you can visit the Orinoco Delta, the Canaima National Park, the Guri Reservoir, the colonial castles on the banks of the Orinoco River and many other points of great interest. The Guayana Castles are located on the right bank of the Orinoco, about 35 km downstream from San Félix, although already in the territory of the Delta Amacuro state.

In addition, Ciudad Guayana is privileged, as it is the headquarters and objective of the International Nautical Rally "Our Rivers Are Navigable", which is the most important nationally and the longest in the world held in fresh water.

Places of interest 

 Guyana castles
 Chirica Hill
 Caroni Ecomuseum
 Cachamay Stadium
 La Barraca Foundation
 São Félix Sidewalk
 Missions of the Purísima Concepción del Caroní
 Railway Dock
 Cachamay Park
 The Foundation Park
 Loefling Zoo
 Water Square
 Christmas Square
 Pineapple Bottle
 Las Macagua Dam
 SIDOR Art Room
 Rainy Leap

Parishes 

The parish of 5 de Julio, which was disputed between the Municipality of Casacoima of the Delta Amacuro State and the Caroni Municipality of the Bolívar State, was finally ceded to the Caroni Municipality by decision of the Supreme Court of Justice.

Government
The mayor of the Caroní Municipality is José Ramón López Rondón., elected on December 8, 2013 with 51.21% of the vote.  He replaced Clemente Scotto Domínguez.  The municipality is divided into 11 parishes; Cachamay, Chirica, Dalla Costa, Once de Abril, Simón Bolívar, Unare, Universidad, Vista al Sol, Pozo Verde, Yocoima and Cinco de Julio.

Anthem 
Words and Music: Armando Yánez Caicedo
 Chorus
 Caroni! of the great deeds
 real autonomous municipality,
 where Tweet the strange strings
 boldly shattered great,
 Caroni! Great Chest of Wealth
 and orchard of the national country,
 we hail your rare greatness
 with sacrosanct, filial love.

 I
 Your profile of landscapes and neighborhoods
 With the river that he named you,
 they present you with palm signs
 as being that San Félix gestated.
 Oh! Eden. your precious waterfalls
 they argue the magic of the sea,
 with their flirtatious fairy laughs
 and unparalleled Natura nuance.

 II
 Caroni! Beautiful, thriving land
 paradise of the right man,
 sedation of the active traveler
 and the world ideal solace.
 Your city, the great Guiana
 and your people, gentle and true,
 they are the confidence of today and tomorrow
 fertile life guarantee.

References

External links
caroni-bolivar.gob.ve  

Municipalities of Bolívar (state)
Ciudad Guayana